Events from the year 1958 in France.

Incumbents
President: Rene Coty 
President of the Council of Ministers: 
 until 14 May: Félix Gaillard
 14 May-1 June: Pierre Pflimlin
 starting 1 June: Charles de Gaulle

Events
1 January – Carrefour group set up.
13 May – Crisis caused by putsch attempt in Algiers involving French officers.
1 June – Charles de Gaulle is brought out of retirement to lead France by decree for six months.
4 June – Charles de Gaulle visits Algeria.
28 September – A majority of 79% says yes to the constitution of the French Fifth Republic.
2 October – Guinea declares itself independent from France.
3 November – New UNESCO building inaugurated in Paris.
23 November – Legislative Election held.
25 November – French Sudan gains autonomy as a self-governing member of the French Community.
28 November – Chad, the Republic of the Congo, and Gabon become autonomous republics within the French Community.
30 November – Legislative Election held, to elect the first National Assembly of the Fifth Republic.
1 December – Central African Republic becomes independent from France.
21 December – Presidential Election won by Charles de Gaulle.

Arts and literature
Yves Klein releases his work IKB74 (one of his monochrome blue panels in his signature blue).

Sport
26 June – Tour de France begins.
19 July – Tour de France ends, won by Charly Gaul of Luxembourg.

Births
19 January – Thierry Tusseau, international soccer player
26 July – Thierry Gilardi, football and rugby commentator (died 2008)
31 August – Éric Zemmour, political journalist and author
2 September – Olivier Grouillard, racing driver
21 September – Bruno Fitoussi, poker player
2 October – Didier Sénac, footballer
26 October – Pascale Ogier, actress (died 1984)
24 November – Alain Chabat, actor and director

Deaths
13 February – Georges Rouault, painter and printmaker (born 1871)
14 August – Frédéric Joliot-Curie, physicist and Nobel laureate (born 1900)
22 August – Roger Martin du Gard, author, winner of the 1937 Nobel Prize for Literature (born 1881)
11 October – Maurice de Vlaminck, painter, printmaker and author (born 1876)

See also
 1958 in French television
 List of French films of 1958

References

1950s in France